Murder 3 is a 2013 Indian Hindi-language psychological thriller film. It is the third instalment in the Murder film series and sequel to the 2011 film, Murder 2. Directed by Vishesh Bhatt and produced by Mukesh Bhatt from Vishesh Films. This is the third installment in the series and unlike its predecessors, is an official remake of the Colombian thriller The Hidden Face. Murder 3 was released on 15 February 2013 to mixed reviews and was a flop.

Plot
The film opens with Vikram (Randeep Hooda), a hot-shot fashion and wildlife photographer, viewing a video of his girlfriend, Roshni (Aditi Rao Hydari) telling him she is leaving him. Vikram becomes distraught. While drinking away his sorrows at a bar, he meets Nisha Sengupta (Sara Loren) and they have a relationship where Nisha moves into the house that Vikram was sharing with Roshni. Vikram becomes a suspect in the disappearance of Roshni, however, the investigators can find no evidence of Vikram's involvement in Roshni's disappearance.

It is revealed that the house is owned by a British lady who shows Roshni a secret room built to hide her husband just in case someone came to look for him because he was in British Army at the time of 1947. The room is self-contained

In a flashback, it is also shown that Roshni, jealous of Vikram's relationship with one of his colleague, decided to pretend she is leaving him. She creates the video saying she is leaving as she hides in the secret room. The room has some one way mirrors where she can observe Vikram's reaction. When she decides he has had enough she looks for the key and realises she lost the key and is now trapped in the room with no way to contact him.

Nisha finds the key to the secret room, but she does not know what it is used for. Nisha eventually figures out that Roshni is trapped in the house because Roshni is able to communicate through tapping on the pipes in the secret room. As Nisha is ready to open the door, she pauses and decides not to rescue Roshni because she might lose Vikram after that. Nisha struggles with her decision, but decides to open the door and check on Roshni when the investigators give Nisha a package containing some images. As Nisha is checking on Roshni laying in a bed in the secret room, Roshni surprises Nisha and knocks her out with a glass bottle and leaves Nisha locked in the room. After Roshni comes out of the secret room, she sees the images and the package, which are pictures of Vikram and his colleague in compromising situations, shattering her. She decides to leave the house. She leaves that picture of Vikram with his colleague on mirror and also sticks her necklace to show Vikram that she is out and then she sends the keys of the room to the investigator who actually loves Nisha. The investigator comes and arrests Vikram while Nisha is stranded in the room as both Vikram and the investigator have no knowledge about the room and the key. The final scene shows Roshni tearing her and Vikram's photograph and is going on a highway road in a car alone, happy on leaving the devastated and arrested Vikram.

Cast
Randeep Hooda as Vikram
Aditi Rao Hydari as Roshni
Sara Loren as Nisha Sengupta
Rajesh Shringarpure as Kabir (Police Officer).
 Karla Singh as Mrs. Fields
 Bugs Bhargava as DK Bose, Vikram's boss

Casting
The makers of the films, who also worked on Murder and Murder 2 decided that Emraan Hashmi would not be returning for the third movie and that Randeep Hooda would play the leading role Asin Thottumkal was originally considered for the lead female role, however, she was not happy with the script and the role went to Esha Gupta. Yet, talks with Gupta fell through and Aditi Rao Hydari was finally cast as the female lead. Pakistani actress Sara Loren was then chosen as the second female lead.

Production and development
The film was shot in Cape Town, South Africa and Goa, India.

Mahesh Bhatt said "Murder 3 is the 2013 equivalent of his 1983 controversial film, Arth. Then it was the institution of marriage that was deconstructed and 30 years later Murder 3 deconstructs love and questions its very existence in today's world of relationship crimes. Now that we have the official rights of the film (The Hidden Face), we look to doing it justice and taking the Murder franchise forward."

Critical reception
Murder 3 received mixed reviews from critics.
Taran Adarsh of Bollywood Hungama gave it 4 out of 5 and stated that Murder 3 "is one of the finest thrillers to come out of Vishesh Films. An outstanding story narrated with ferocious enthusiasm. Vishesh Bhatt hits a boundary in his very first attempt!" Madhureeta Mukherjee of The Times Of India gave it 3 out of 5, while commenting 'This one's no bloody Valentine, but watch it if you like it twisted.' Komal Nahta wrote, 'On the whole, Murder 3 is a fair entertainer'.Nabanita of OneIndia also gave it 3 out of 5 while commenting that it has thrills but it fails to captivate. Roshni Devi of Koimoi gave it 2.5 out of 5, saying that it is worth a watch. Saibal Chatterjee of NDTV gave it 2.5/5 stars and stated 'Murder 3, a thriller that vacillates between the taut to the toxic, packs enough punch and panache to keep the audience glued, if not sweep them off their feet. It tweaks the formula just a tad – it goes somewhat easy on the erotic component of the Murder franchise, opts for a markedly stronger emotional spine, and gives the female characters more than usual space.'

Anupama Chopra gave it 2/5 while writing that 'With a little more imagination, Murder 3 could have been deliciously dark'. Sukanya Verma for Rediff.com has given 2/5 stars and says Murder 3 has some badly-acted thrills.

Soundtrack

The soundtrack of the film is composed by Pritam, Anupam Amod & Roxen (band). The lyrics are penned by Sayeed Quadri. The soundtrack was released on 2 February 2013. The songs were immensely popular specially the songs "Teri Jhuki Nazar" and "Hum Jee Lenge" was immensely popular among the masses while the other tracks like "Mat Azma Re" and "Jaata Hai Tujh Tak" were also very popular gaining good critical review and mass appeal. The music focused on the Rock Genre and was unique in the Murder brand.

Track list
The soundtrack consists of 8 tracks which are composed by Pritam, Anupam Amod & Roxen Band.

The soundtrack received positive critical response. Planet Bollywood gave it 7.5/10 calling it a great album. Joginder Tuteja of Bollywood Hungama gave it 3.5/5 while Koimoi gave it 3/5.

References

External links
 
 

2013 films
2010s erotic thriller films
Indian psychological thriller films
2013 psychological thriller films
Films shot in South Africa
Indian sequel films
Films featuring songs by Pritam
2010s Hindi-language films
Fox Star Studios films
Indian erotic thriller films
Indian remakes of Spanish films